Gold Coast United Football Club is an Australian semi-professional association football club based in Gold Coast, Queensland. The club was formed in 2008.

Key
Key to league competitions:

 A-League – Australia's top football league, established in 2005
 National Premier Leagues Queensland (NPL Queensland)

Key to colours and symbols:

Key to league record:
 Season = The year and article of the season
 Pos = Final position
 Pld = Games played
 W = Games won
 D = Games drawn
 L = Games lost
 GF = Goals scored
 GA = Goals against
 Pts = Points

Seasons

References
 aleaguestats.com

Gold Coast United FC
Gold Coast United FC seasons
Gold Coast United